Liga Deportiva Universitaria de Quito's 1975 season was the club's 45th year of existence, the 22nd year in professional football and the 15th in the top level of professional football in Ecuador.

Squad

Competitions

Serie A

First stage

Results

Second stage

Results

Liguilla Final

Results

Copa Libertadores

First stage

Semi-finals

External links

RSSSF - 1975 Serie A 
RSSSF - 1975 Copa Libertadores 

1975